Berthe Morisot with a Fan is a painting by French artist Édouard Manet, executed in 1874. It is the last of the twelve portraits that Manet produced of fellow painter and model Berthe Morisot, between 1868 and 1874, made just after her marriage to the painter's brother Eugène, after which she no longer posed for him. It shows her dressed in mourning for her father but wearing an engagement ring.

It entered Morisot's own collection, possibly directly from the artist, before being donated to the French state in 1999. It was initially allocated to the Musée d'Orsay, in Paris, before being moved in 2000 to the Palais des Beaux-Arts de Lille, where it still hangs.

References

Paintings by Édouard Manet
Portraits of women
19th-century portraits
1874 paintings
Paintings in the collection of the Palais des Beaux-Arts de Lille